Sergei Prokofiev's Violin Sonata No. 1 in F minor, Op 80, written between 1938 and 1946 (completed two years after Violin Sonata No. 2), is one of the darkest and most brooding of the composer's works.  Prokofiev was awarded the 1947 Stalin prize for this composition.

Structure

The work is about 30 minutes long and is in four movements of roughly equal length:
Andante assai (F minor)
Allegro brusco (C major)
Andante (F major)
Allegrissimo - Andante assai, come prima (F major → F minor)

Prokofiev had described the slithering violin scales at the end of the 1st and 4th movements as 'wind passing through a graveyard'.

The work was premiered by David Oistrakh and Lev Oborin on October 23, 1946, under the personal coaching of the composer.
During rehearsals, Oborin played a certain passage, marked forte, too gently for Prokofiev's liking, who insisted it should be more aggressive.  Oborin replied that he was afraid of drowning out the violin, but Prokofiev said "It should sound in such a way that people should jump in their seat, and people will say 'Is he out of his mind?'".

The first and third movements of the sonata were played at Prokofiev's funeral by Oistrakh and Samuil Feinberg.

Notes

External links
Recording of Violin Sonata No. 1 Sergei Ostrovsky (violin) (Wayback Machine archive).
Video - Prokofiev Violin Sonata No 1 - Complete (28:10).
Video - Prokofiev Violin Sonata No.1 in F minor - Live recording from Wigmore Hall / Lana Trotovsek (violin), Maria Canyigueral (piano) 

Chamber music by Sergei Prokofiev
Prokofiev 01
1946 compositions
Compositions in F minor